Veselíčko may refer to places in the Czech Republic:

Veselíčko (Písek District), a municipality and village in the South Bohemian Region
Veselíčko (Přerov District), a municipality and village in the Olomouc Region
Veselíčko, a village and part of Luká in the Olomouc Region
Veselíčko, a village and part of Žďár nad Sázavou in the Vysočina Region